Juan Cano is a retired Colombian-American soccer forward who played professionally in the American Soccer League and the North American Soccer League.

In 1974, Cano signed with the Rhode Island Oceaneers of the American Soccer League.  In 1977, he moved to the New Jersey Americans.  He was First Team All League that season.  In 1979, he moved up to the New England Tea Men of the North American Soccer League.  In October 1980, the Tea Men released Cano.  In 1981, he moved to the New England Sharks of the ASL.  He later played in the semi-professional Southern New England Super Indoor Soccer League.

References

External links
NASL stats

1956 births
Living people
American soccer players
American Soccer League (1933–1983) players
North American Soccer League (1968–1984) indoor players
New England Sharks players
New England Tea Men players
New Jersey Americans (ASL) players
North American Soccer League (1968–1984) players
Rhode Island Oceaneers players
Association football midfielders